Michal Buchtel (born 1986) is a Czech slalom canoeist who competed at the international level from 2002 to 2011.

He won a gold medal in the K1 team event at the 2009 ICF Canoe Slalom World Championships in La Seu d'Urgell.

References

12 September 2009 final results for the men's K1 team event at the 2009 ICF Canoe Slalom World Championships. - accessed 12 September 2009.

Czech male canoeists
Living people
1986 births
Medalists at the ICF Canoe Slalom World Championships
21st-century Czech people